The Pyongyang Metro is the rapid transit system in the North Korean capital Pyongyang. It consists of two lines: the Chollima Line, which runs north from Puhŭng Station on the banks of the Taedong River to Pulgŭnbyŏl Station, and the Hyŏksin Line, which runs from Kwangbok Station in the southwest to Ragwŏn Station in the northeast.  The two lines intersect at Chŏnu Station.

Daily ridership is estimated to be between 300,000 and 700,000. Structural engineering of the Metro was completed by North Korea, with rolling stock and related electronic equipment imported from China. This was later replaced with rolling stock acquired from East Germany.

The Pyongyang Metro has a museum devoted to its construction and history.

Construction

Construction of the metro network started in 1965, and stations were opened between 1969 and 1972 by president Kim Il-sung. Most of the 16 public stations were built in the 1970s, except for the two most grandiose stations—Puhŭng and Yŏnggwang, which were constructed in 1987. According to NK News sources, construction accidents in the 1970s are alleged to have potentially killed dozens of workers.

China had provided technical aid for the metro's construction, sending experts to install equipment made in China, including electrical equipment made in Xiangtan, Hunan and the escalator with vertical height of 64 m made by Shanghai Seleva.

Due to the depth of the metro and the lack of outside segments, its stations can double as bomb shelters, with blast doors in place at hallways. It takes three and a half minutes from the ground to the platform by escalator. The metro is so deep that the temperature of the platform maintains a constant  all year. The Saint Petersburg Metro also claims to be the deepest, based on the average depth of all its stations. The deepest heavy rail station in the world is the Jerusalem–Yitzhak Navon railway station, located  underground. The Porta Alpina railway station, located above the Gotthard Base Tunnel in Switzerland, was supposed to be  underground, but the project was indefinitely shelved in 2012.

The system was initially electrified at 825 volts, but lowered down to 750 volts to support operation of the Class GI sets. However, this conflicts with the documentation on the DK4 sets, which uses 750 volts with a +20% and a -38% tolerance.

A 1999 KBS news broadcast stated that two lines were under construction, with line 3 to run from Kwangbok station to Mangyongdae, while the location of line 4 was unknown. The two lines were to open for the 55th Party Foundation Day. 

In 2012, Korean Central Television released renders of a new station bearing the name Mangyongdae displayed at the Pyongyang Architectural Festival.

In 2018, NK News claimed that there would be possible extensions to the metro system, with anonymous sources claiming activity to the west of Kwangbok Station. Commercial satellite imagery revealed only one structure under construction, and it speculated an absence of announcements from state media was due to funding issues, as well as due to the 1970s tunneling accidents.

In 2019, Kaeson station and Tongil Station were modernised, adding TVs that show the next service and brighter lighting. This was followed by Jonu station and Chonsung station in 2020. The TVs can also display a digital version of the Rodong Sinmun.

At the 8th Congress of the Workers' Party of Korea, it was announced to push forward on the updating and renovation of the Pyongyang Metro, along with the production of new-type subway trains.

Operation

The Pyongyang Metro was designed to operate every few minutes. During rush hour, the trains can operate at a minimum interval of two minutes. The trains have the ability to play music and other recordings. In actual service, they run at every 3 minutes in rush hour and every 5 minutes throughout the day.

The Pyongyang Metro is the cheapest in the world to ride, at only five North Korean won (worth half of a US cent) per ticket. Instead of paper tickets, the Metro previously used an aluminium token, with the emblem of the Metro minted on it and the Korean "". It has used a paper ticket system, with "" printed with blue ink on it. Tickets are bought at station booths. Nowadays, the network uses contactless cards that feature the logo of the network and a train set on the front, with the terms and conditions on the other side. Gates display the number of trips remaining on the card, with a trip being a tap on entry and exit. Smoking and eating inside the Metro system is prohibited and is punishable by a large fine.

Pyongyang Metro Administration Bureau, the operator of the system, is ranked at the dead-last place in the world when it comes to the metro's inaccessibility to disabled people with wheelchairs. This is due to the North Korean government excluding persons with disabilities in the society, which is a violation of human rights, generating criticism from the United Nations' Human Rights Council. This makes Pyongyang's public transport accessibility to the disabled the worst in the world after Moscow Metro in Moscow, Russia and the New York City Subway in New York City, United States.

Network

The Pyongyang Metro network consists of two lines:
  Chollima Line, named after a winged horse from ancient Korean mythology. Construction started in 1968, and the line opened on September 6, 1973. The total route contains the Puhung, Yonggwang, Ponghwa, Sŭngni, Tongil, Kaeson, Jonu, and Pulgunbyol stations.
Regular service started on October 9, 1975. The route contains the Kwangbok, Konguk, Hwanggumbol, Konsol, Hyoksin, Jonsung, Samhung, and Rakwon stations. The closed Kwangmyong station is located between the Samhung and Rakwon stations.
The two lines have a linking track, located somewhere near Jonsung station.

Most metro stations bear reference to nearby features, with Kaesŏn Station ("Triumph station") being located at the Arch of Triumph, Yonggwang station located near Yonggwang street, Sungni station at Sungni street.

The network runs entirely underground. The design of the network was based on metro networks in other communist countries, in particular the Moscow Metro. Both networks share many characteristics, such as the great depth of the lines (over ) and the large distances between stations. Another common feature is the Socialist realist art on display in the stations - such as murals and statues. Staff of the Metro have a military-style uniform that is specific to these workers. Each Metro station has a free toilet for use by patrons. Stations also play state radio-broadcasts and have a display of the Rodong Sinmun newspaper.

In times of war, the metro stations can serve as bomb shelters. For this purpose the stations are fitted with large steel doors. Some sources claim that large military installations are connected to the stations, and also that there exist secret lines solely for government use.

One station, Kwangmyŏng, has been closed since 1995 due to the mausoleum of Kim Il-sung being located at that station. Trains do not stop at that station.

The map of the Hyŏksin line shows two additional stations after Kwangbok: Yŏngung and Ch'ilgol, both of them reportedly under development. The map of the Chollima Line, on the other hand, shows four additional stations, two at each end of the line—Ryŏnmot, Sŏp'o, Ch'ŏngch'un and Man'gyŏngdae—also planned or under development. However, the most recent maps omit these stations. The Chollima line is already connected to the State Railway Sopo station on the way to the metro depot, and plans of the metro seem to suggest that the non-commercial segment of this line would be eventually part of the metro system. However, the current tunnel exit does not allow for this, as this segment does not have third rail electrification, and is locomotive hauled by the GKD5B shunters and would require negotiating a switchback.

In addition to the main system for passenger use, there is allegedly an extra system for government use, similar to Moscow's Metro-2. The secret Pyongyang system supposedly connects important government locations. There is also reportedly a massive underground plaza for mobilization, as well as an underground road connecting two metro stations.

Rolling stock

When operations on the Metro started in the 1970s, newly built DK4 passenger cars were used, made for North Korea by the Chinese firm Changchun Railway Vehicles. 

Some of the Chinese-made rolling stock have been observed operating near the Sinuiju area and northern regions.

Since 1997, the Pyongyang Metro has mainly used former German rolling stock from the Berlin U-Bahn. 

The former Berlin trainsets were given a new red and cream livery in Pyongyang. All advertising was removed and replaced by portraits of leaders, Kim Il-sung and Kim Jong-il. In 2000, a BBC reporter saw "old East German trains complete with their original German graffiti". Koryo Tours in another article write about and show the old West-Berlin D-trains, suggesting that the BBC article could have mixing them up with the Class GI of East Berlin. After about 2006, Type D cars were mainly used. The Class GI rolling stock has been banned from underground tunnel operations due to frequent control stand fires and was withdrawn from Metro service in 2001, and those cars are now operating on the railway network around Pyongyang and northern regions as commuter trains. One Type D metro car appears to have been converted into a departmental vehicle, with a subsequently installed second driver's cab at the car's back next to the inter carriage door. The metro car is painted in yellow with red warning trims.

In 2015, Kim Jong-un rode a newly manufactured four car train set which was reported to have been developed and built at Kim Chong-t'ae Electric Locomotive Works in North Korea, although the cars appeared to be significantly renovated D-class cars. This set is named 'Underground Electric Vehicle No. 1'. It features a VVVF control and initially fitted with an asynchronous motor but later replaced with a permanent magnet synchronous motor developed by the Kim Chaek University of Technology. It usually runs on the Chollima Line but has also ran on the Hyoksin Line.

As a gift to the 8th Congress of the Workers' Party of Korea, it is reported that the Kim Chong-t'ae Electric Locomotive Works are working to complete new metro cars, promoted by the 80 day campaign. However, in the Korean Central News Agency article summarising the eighty day campaign, there was no mention of any new vehicles being produced. Previously, it was reported that a 4 door set was to be manufactured to mainly run on the Hyoksin line, to be named Underground Electric Vehicle No. 2. Another news report stated that Kim Chong-tae Locomotive Works was organising the serial production of the Underground Electric Vehicle Type 1 for the 80 day campaign and mentioned the construction of the car body. However, although this was a goal of the 80 day campaign, a new set has yet to be built.

Tourism

In general, tourism in North Korea is allowed only in guided groups with no diversion allowed from pre-planned itineraries. Foreign tourists used to be allowed to travel only between Puhŭng Station and Yŏnggwang Station. However, foreign students were allowed to freely use the entire metro system. Since 2010, tourists have been allowed to ride the metro at six stations, and in 2014, all of the metro stations were opened to foreigners. University students traveling with the Pyongyang Project have also reported visiting every station.

, it is possible for tourists on special Public Transport Tours to take metro rides through both lines, including visits to all stations. In April 2014, the first tourist group visited stations on both metro lines, and it is expected that such extended visits to both metro lines will remain possible for future tourist groups.

The previously limited tourist access gave rise to a conspiracy theory that the metro was purely for show. It was claimed that it only consisted of two stops and that the passengers were actors.

Museum
Pyongyang Metro has its own museum. A large portion of the collection is related to President Kim Il-sung providing "on-the-spot guidance" to the workers constructing the system. Among the exhibits are a special funicular-like vehicle which the president used to descend to a station under construction (it rode down the inclined tunnels that would eventually be used by the escalators), and a railbus in which he rode around the system. The museum also has a map of the planned lines; it shows the Chollima and Hyoksin line terminating at a common station near Chilgol, the third line that would cross the Taedong River, eventually terminating near Rakrang and the locations of the depots, one far past the western terminus of the Hyoksin line and the depot in Sopo for the Chollima line.

Gallery

Network Map

See also

Trams in Pyongyang
Rail transport in North Korea

References

Notes

Bibliography
Pyongyang Metro, Pyongyang: Foreign Languages Publishing House, 1980

Further reading

Daniel Edelson, An Israeli's journey to North Korea. Ynet. 30 August 2015.

External links

TOURS BY PUBLIC TRANSPORTATIONS - DPR Korea Tour 
TRAFFIC FANS TOUR - DPR Korea Tour  
평양지하철 비공식 홈페이지 
평양 지하철도 - 나무위키 
平壌地下鉄 - 西船junctionどっと混む 
Pyongyang Metro - UrbanRail.Net (Wayback Machine) 
Pyongyang Metro - Steve Gong • Photo | Video 
Pyongyang Real Distance Metro Map 
Photos of all Metro stations 
Video of all Metro stations 

 
Metro
Rapid transit in North Korea
Underground rapid transit in North Korea
Standard gauge railways in North Korea
1973 establishments in North Korea
Railway lines opened in 1973
Articles containing video clips